Antoine Goléa (real name Siegfried Goldman) (30 August 1906 in Vienna – 12 October 1980 in Paris) was a French musicologist of Romanian origin. He was one of the founding members of the Académie Charles-Cros.

Biography 
Having been pushed by his father to become a violinist, Antoine Goléa entered the Conservatory of Bucharest at the age of nine, and studied violin under the guidance of Cecilia Nitzulescu, a brilliant and despotic "failed violinist", who initially believed in his talent. But, after nine years of study, they both have to face the facts: he was not made to be a virtuoso violinist, despite his undeniable gifts, in particular that of the "absolute pitch", and despite the first violin prize which crowned his long years of study. He was then eighteen years old. After three years at the French high school in Bucharest, his parents decided to send him to France to complete his secondary education. He arrived in Montpellier towards the end of the summer of 1928 and, having obtained his bachelor's degree in philosophy and a certificate of higher studies in German, he moved to Paris in October 1929, where he settled for the rest of his life.

Goléa was one of the first participants of the famous radio talk  by Armand Panigel, launched in 1947 on RTF (and later on France Musique), alongside Claude Rostand, José Bruyr, and Henri Jacques. Other eminent critics later joined this Tribune, in particular Jacques Bourgeois and Jean Roy.

He also wrote a Histoire du ballet (1967).

Towards the end of his life, however, Goléa was led to somewhat soften his positions. In the last published work of his lifetime (La Musique de la nuit des temps aux aurores nouvelles.), he must recognize that "an even more serious phenomenon has occurred: serial music died of his beautiful death..."

However, Goléa has always been an ardent defender of the music of Debussy, Messiaen, Schoenberg and Boulez, whom he considered to be the true creators of contemporary music, whereas, when asked what a Richard Strauss meant in the evolution of contemporary music, his answer was astounding: "Nothing, very exactly!

He was married to singer Colette Herzog. They are both buried at Cimetière parisien de Bagneux.

Quote 
Excerpt from an article published in the journal Musica in 1956, and included in his biography Je suis un violoniste raté:

Publications 
1954: Esthétique de la musique contemporaine, PUF
1958: Georges Auric, éditions Ventadour
1959: Rencontres avec Pierre Boulez, éditions Julliard
1960: La Musique dans la société européenne, du Moyen Âge à nos jours, Bibliothèque de l'homme d'action
1961: Rencontres avec Olivier Messiaen, éditions Julliard
1962: 20 ans de musique contemporaine. De Messiaen à Boulez. De Boulez à l'inconnu, 2 vol.
1965: Richard Strauss, Flammarion
1967: Entretiens avec Wieland Wagner, éditions Belfond
1967: Histoire du ballet, éd. Rencontres
1968: Claude Debussy, Seghers
1969: Marcel Landowski, Seghers, 1969
1977: La Musique, de la nuit des temps aux aurores nouvelles, éditions Alphonse Leduc,  2 vol.
1980: Georges Enesco, un grand inconnu, éditions Salabert, 1980
1981: Je suis un violoniste raté, éditions Julliard; reissued Belfond, followed by Et après by Jérôme Spycket
 Important chapters in the following collective works: Wagner, Bach, Mozart, Liszt, Berlioz, Debussy, all published in the series Génies et Réalités, éditions Réalités-Hachette

References

External links 
  Radioscopie d'Antoine Goléa (20 January 1978) on INA.fr
 La tribune des critiques de disques. Armand Panigel, Antoine Goléa, Jacques Bourgeois. on YouTube

20th-century French musicologists
1906 births
Writers from Vienna
1980 deaths
Messiaen scholars